Stephen David Nash (born 1954 in Clacton-on-Sea, Essex, England) is an English wildlife artist who primarily specialises on primates. He is currently based at the Stony Brook University on Long Island, New York, USA, in the Department of Anatomical Sciences where he works as a visiting research associate.

Career
Nash spent his school days in Clacton-on-Sea. After attending the Holland Park County Primary School he graduated from Colbayn's High School in 1973. Subsequently, he studied at the Colchester School of Art, the Middlesex University, and the Royal College of Art where he received his Bachelor of Arts degree in graphic
design (scientific illustration) in 1979 and his Master of Arts degree in natural history illustration in July 1982.  Nash initially planned a profession as medical illustrator but changed his career path after he had seen the Callitrichid monkeys for the first time at London Zoo. Since 1982 he worked for Dr. Russell Mittermeier, chairman of the IUCN/SSC Primate Specialist Group and president of Conservation International, and for Dr. Anthony Rylands, deputy chairman of the IUCN/SSC Primate Specialist Group. After the founding of Conservation International in 1987, Nash became its scientific illustrator in 1989. In 1990 he married Luci Betti who also works as an illustrator. Nash provided illustrations for numerous books, scientific articles, and conservation education materials, including Monkeyshines on the Primates: A Study of Primatology (1994), Lemurs of Madagascar (1994), Primates of West Africa: Pocket Identification Guide (2010) and the primates volume of the Handbook of the Mammals of the World (2013).

In 2002 Marc van Roosmalen and Russell Mittermeier commemorated Nash with the name of the titi monkey Callicebus stephennashi. In 2004, the American Society of Primatologists honored him with its President's Award and in 2008 he received the PSGB Occasional Medal of the Primate Society of Great Britain.

Publications (selected)
Birds in the Tanjung Puting National Park, Kalimantan Tengah Province, 1986
The Birds of Java and Bali, 1989
The Birds of Sumatra and Kalimantan, 1991
Sold for a song: the trade in Southeast Asian non-CITES birds, 1993
Monkeyshines on the Primates: A Study of Primatology, 1994
Lemurs of Madagascar, 1994
From Steppe to Store, 1995
Primate Adaption and Evolution, 1999
North American Regional Studbook for White-cheeked Gibbon Nomascus Leucogenys and Golden-cheeked Gibbon Nomascus Gabriellae, 2000
Primates of Colombia, 2005
Libro rojo de los mamíferos de Colombia, 2006
Primates of West Africa: Pocket Identification Guide. 2010 
Handbook of the Mammals of the World Vol 3 Primates, 2013

Footnotes

References
Biography for Stephen D. Nash at Lynx edicions
Profile at the IUCN Primate Specialist Group

1954 births
Living people
English illustrators
Animal artists